In neuroanatomy, a sulcus (Latin: "furrow", pl. sulci) is a depression or groove in the cerebral cortex. 
It surrounds a gyrus (pl. gyri), creating the characteristic folded appearance of the brain in humans and other mammals. The larger sulci are usually called fissures.

Structure
Sulci, the grooves, and gyri, the folds or ridges, make up the folded surface of the cerebral cortex. Larger or deeper sulci are termed fissures, and in many cases the two terms are interchangeable. The folded cortex creates a larger surface area for the brain in humans and other mammals. When looking at the human brain, two-thirds of the surface are hidden in the grooves. The sulci and fissures are both grooves in the cortex, but they are differentiated by size. A sulcus is a shallower groove that surrounds a gyrus. A fissure is a large furrow that divides the brain into lobes and also into the two hemispheres as the longitudinal fissure.

Importance of expanded surface area
As the surface area of the brain increases more functions are made possible. A smooth-surfaced brain is only able to grow to a certain extent.  A depression, sulcus, in the surface area allows for continued growth.  This in turn allows for the functions of the brain to continue growing.

Variation
The sulcal pattern varies between human individuals, and the most elaborate overview on this variation is probably an atlas by Ono, Kubick and Abernathey: Atlas of the Cerebral Sulci.
Some of the more prominent sulci are, however, seen across individuals – and even species – making a common nomenclature across individuals and species possible.

Development

In humans, cerebral convolutions  appear at about five months and take at least into the first year after birth to fully develop. Development varies greatly between individuals. The potential influences of genetic, epigenetic and environmental factors are not fully understood. It has been found that the width of cortical sulci increases not only with age, but also with cognitive decline in the elderly.

Types
Sulci are divided into following categories:

On the basis of function:
 
A limiting sulcus separates at its floor into two areas which are different functionally and structurally e.g. central sulcus between the motor and sensory areas.
Axial sulcus develops in the long axis of a rapidly growing homogeneous area e.g. postcalcarine sulcus in the long axis of the striate area.
Operculated sulcus separates by its lips into two areas and contains a third area in the walls of the sulcus e.g. lunate sulcus is an operculated sulcus, separating the striate and parastriate areas.
 
On the basis of formation:
Primary sulci: formed before birth, independently. Example: central sulcus.
Secondary sulcus: produced by factors other than the exuberant growth in the adjoining areas of the cortex Examples are the lateral and parieto-occipital sulci.

On the basis of depth:
Complete sulcus is very deep so as to cause elevation in the walls of the lateral ventricle. Examples are the collateral and calcarine sulci.
Incomplete sulci are superficially situated and are not very deep, E.g. paracentral sulcus.

Notable sulci
 Calcarine sulcus
 Central sulcus
 Central sulcus of insula
 Cingulate sulcus
 Circular sulcus of insula
 Callosal sulcus
 Collateral sulcus
 Fimbrodentate sulcus
 Florance-robertal sulcus
 Hippocampal sulcus
 Inferior frontal sulcus
 Inferior temporal sulcus
 Intraparietal sulcus
 Lateral sulcus
 Lunate sulcus
 Occipitotemporal sulcus
 Olfactory sulcus
 Paracentral sulcus
 Parieto-occipital sulcus
 Postcentral sulcus
 Precentral sulcus
 Rhinal sulcus
 Subparietal sulcus
 Superior frontal sulcus
 Superior temporal sulcus
 Transverse occipital sulcus
 Transverse temporal sulcus

Other animals
The variation in the number of fissures in the brain (gyrification) between species is related to the size of the animal and the size of the brain. Mammals that have smooth-surfaced or nonconvoluted brains are called lissencephalics and those that have folded or convoluted brains gyrencephalics. The division between the two groups occurs when cortical surface area is about 10 cm2 and the brain has a volume of 3–4 cm3. Large rodents such as beavers and capybaras are gyrencephalic and smaller rodents such as rats and mice lissencephalic.

Macaque
A macaque has a more simple sulcal pattern. In a monograph Bonin and Bailey list the following as the primary sulci:
 Calcarine fissure (ca)
 Central sulcus (ce)
 Sulcus cinguli (ci)
 Hippocampal fissure (h)
 Sulcus intraparitalis (ip)
 Lateral fissure (or Sylvian fissure) (la)
 Sulcus olfactorius (olf)
 Medial parieto-occipital fissure (pom)
 Fissura rhinalis (rh)
 Sulcus temporalis superior (ts) – This sulcus runs parallel to the lateral fissure and extends to the temporal pole and often superficially merges with it.

See also

 Sulcus (morphology)

References

External links
Visual explanation of gyri, sulci, and fissures

Neuroanatomy